Events from the year 1992 in Iran.

Incumbents
 Supreme Leader: Ali Khamenei
 President: Akbar Hashemi Rafsanjani 
 Vice President: Hassan Habibi
 Chief Justice: Mohammad Yazdii

Events

Births

 16 July – Saeid Lotfi

See also
 Years in Iraq
 Years in Afghanistan

References

 
Iran
Years of the 20th century in Iran
1990s in Iran
Iran